The men's Individual competition of the modern pentathlon events at the 2015 Pan American Games was held on July 19 at the CIBC Pan Am/Parapan Am Aquatics Centre and Field House.

The top placed North American and South American athlete, along with the next three best athletes in each event (maximum on per nation) will qualify for the 2016 Summer Olympics in Rio de Janeiro, Brazil.

Format
For the second time at a Pan American Games, the modern pentathlon events will introduce laser shooting (as opposed to pistol shooting) and a combined shooting/running event. Athletes will compete first in epée fencing followed by swimming the 200 metre freestyle, thirdly in equestrian (jumping) and finally in the combined shooting/running event. The athlete that crosses the line first wins.

Schedule

Results

References

Modern pentathlon at the 2015 Pan American Games